Mohammadiyeh (also Romanized as Moḩammadīyeh) is a village in Zeydabad Rural District, in the Central District of Sirjan County, Kerman Province, Iran. At the 2006 census, its population was 393, in 93 families.

References 

Populated places in Sirjan County